St Vincent Place is a heritage precinct in Albert Park, Victoria, Australia.

St Vincent Place is bounded by Park Street, Cecil Street, Bridport Street, Cardigan Place and Nelson Road. It is bisected by Montague Street, allowing the passage of trams on route 1.  It is an example of nineteenth century residential development around the large landscaped square St Vincent Gardens  It is characterised by beautiful original terrace houses of the 1860s and 1870s.

According to the Victorian Heritage Register, "The St Vincent Place precinct was first designed in 1854 or 55, probably by Andrew Clarke, the Surveyor-General of Victoria. Prior to this, St Vincent's Place, as it is known now, was used as a race track for horses for a period of 9 months or so.  The current layout is the work of Clement designers, the noted surveyor, engineer and topographer, who adapted the design in 1857 to allow for its intersection by the St Kilda railway. The precinct, which in its original configuration extended from Park Street in the north to Bridport Street in the south, and from Howe Crescent in the east to Nelson Road and Cardigan Street in the west, was designed to emulate similar 'square' developments in London, although on a grander scale. The main streets were named after British naval heroes. The development of the special character of St Vincent Place has been characterised, since the first land sales in the 1860s, by a variety of housing stock which has included quality row and detached houses dominated by Rochester Terrace (Heritage Register Number 813), and by the gardens which, although they have been continuously developed, remain faithful to the initial landscape concept."

Historical significance
It is registered with the National Trust of Australia and on the Victorian Heritage Register for its aesthetic, historical, architectural and social significance to the State of Victoria.

The Victorian Heritage Register states St Vincent Place is "aesthetically important for the outstanding quality of its urban landscape. The major elements that reflect this importance are the gardens with their gardenesque style layout and fine collections of mature specimen trees, and the harmonious relationship of the gardens with the residential buildings facing them around St Vincent Place.   The St Vincent Place Precinct is historically important as the premier 'square' development in Victoria based on similar models in London. It is significant as the largest development of its type in Victoria and for its unusual development as gardens rather than the more usual small park as at, for example Macarthur, Murchison, Lincoln and Argyle Squares in Carlton. The precinct is also historically significant for its associations with Surveyor General Andrew Clarke, and more particularly with Clement Hodgkinson, a prolific and influential surveyor engineer in early Melbourne.  The St Vincent Place Precinct is architecturally important for the consistent quality of its built form and its high degree of intactness from its earliest phase of development, characterised by a mixture of one and two storey terraces and detached houses.  The St Vincent Place Precinct is socially important as a reflection of the aspirations of middle class residents in South Melbourne. Because of the shared outlook on and use of the gardens, the precinct has developed a sense of community cohesion unusual in the Melbourne context. The gardens are also socially important as a focus of community life for the surrounding district with the maintenance of their amenity a priority of municipal government since their inception. The existence of the tennis and bowls club s in the gardens for over a century is a further manifestation of this social importance."

The Australian Demographer Bernard Salt included the precinct as first among his "favourite places that have been designed by planners" :  "St Vincent Place, Albert Park: Where would such a list start but in my home city of Melbourne? Surely this residential precinct known only to Melburnians must be one of this nation's town planning treasures. Here are two extended but connecting crescents laid out around gardens which are overlooked by double-storey Victorian terrace houses. Designed in the early 1850s, St Vincent Place was virtually a gated community: the well-to-do would promenade around their public gardens; smaller wooden houses for servants and the working classes were relegated to the lesser enveloping crescents."

People & literature
Marshall Browne's book 'The Gilded Cage' covers an eighteen-month period in 1888–89 and tells the ill-starred love story of William Boyd and Helen O'Neill, and a happier-ending one between Boyd and Katherine Lindsay with a backdrop of "graceful St Vincent Place".

A resident Mary Josephine O'Brien inherited Port Melbourne's Victoria Hotel and O'Brien's Terrace in 1901.

World War I brought grief to several households in St Vincent Place.
Private Harold Frederick Robinson 2184. 7th Bn. Australian Infantry A.I.F. was killed in action 8–9 August 1915. Aged 25, he was the son of the late Samuel and Mary Robinson; husband of Ada May Robinson of 5 St Vincent Place.
A resident, Major Frederick Miller Johnson, 6th Fld Ambulance AAMC, AIF,  Surgeon, of 32 St. Vincent Place was killed in action at Lone Pine, central Anzac, on 29 November 1915, aged 52.
Another resident, Staff Sergeant, John Alfred Eric Crawford, 15046, Australian Army Medical Corps was killed on 16 September 1916. He was the son of Mrs. S.M. Cowen, of 82 St Vincent Place.

In 1928 the first Australian Novitiate of the Catholic Carmelite Order was established in St Vincent Place.

"Albert William Andrews was found in a boarding house in St Vincent's Place, Albert Park in the early 1950s. The place was sold up or his health was deteriorating and the family was contacted."

A 1969 battle to preserve the area from major road construction is described in an interview with Barbara Niven by the Cultural Heritage Centre for Asia and the Pacific 
The battle was in 1972, not 1969. It was launched with a pamphlet showing a map of the alternative routes for the proposed F14 Freeway. Pamphlet Authorized by Reg Macey 68 McGregor Street, Middle Park
In 2006, 2 residents received Australian Honours.   Ms Imogen Laurie received an honour "For service to people with disabilities as an advocate for improved disability policies and services through community and public sector organisations."  Mr Terrence O'Shannassy received an honour "For service to the community, particularly to youth, and to technical education for people seeking employment opportunities''."

Significant buildings and facilities
5 St Vincent Place South: Australian Collaboration
21 St Vincent Place South
Rochester Terrace

51 St Vincent Place South: St Vincent Place Medical Centre
57 St Vincent Place South: The Richard Wagner Society Inc
73 St Vincent Place South: The Loreto Province Centre 
30 St Vincent Place North: Rosebank
44 St Vincent Place North: Hambleton House
94 St Vincent Place North :
78 St Vincent Place North: Peter Wille's House
88 St Vincent Place North is part of Australia's Open Garden Scheme.  The well-known industrialist John Danks chose the French-Romanesque revival style for this pair of terraces when he built them in 1875, rather than the Italianate style so popular for Melbourne's boom-time mansions.  More than a century later, from 1985–1989, both terrace houses were restored following a period as rooming houses. The front gardens, designed as mirror images, are formal in execution, with clipped box hedges, santolina and mounds of Choisya ternata abutting the tiled veranda. Each parterre has as the central feature a massive Haddonstone urn, overflowing with succulents, and in keeping with French style, a fine, pink-beige gravel is used instead of lawn.
The Albert Park Bowls Club
Charles Moore Boer War Memorial Drinking Fountain (named in memory of Charlie Moore)

References
Photo by Charles Pratt c 1925
State Library John T. Collins Photograph of Terrace at 11-19 St Vincent Place (1982)
State Library John T. Collins Photograph of Terrace of Rochester Terrace
Maddison Architects
Richards, D.L. 'Rochester ''Terrace and St Vincent's Place, South Melbourne''', Thesis, University of Melbourne, Faculty of Architecture, Building and Planning--History Essay.
Sheilas, a tribute to Australian women collection, ca. 1975. Photographed in St Vincent Place, Sister Noni was appointed Provincial of the Institute of the Blessed Virgin Mary (Loreto) Order in 1974

Heritage sites in Melbourne
Historic districts
City of Port Phillip